Jesenice is a settlement near Dugi Rat, Croatia, population 2,089 (census 2011). It consists of the villages of Bajnice, Krilo, Orij, and Suhi Potok.

References

Populated places in Split-Dalmatia County